Tim Parenton is an American college baseball coach and former third baseman. He is the head baseball coach at the University of North Florida. He played college baseball and college football at Mississippi State University.

Playing career
Parenton attended Jesuit High School in New Orleans, Louisiana. Parenton played for the school's varsity baseball and football teams all four years in addition to lettering in two other sports. Parenton then enrolled at the Mississippi State University, to play college football for the Mississippi State Bulldogs football team. He appeared in the 1980 Sun Bowl as a reserve quarterback, rushing for −4 yards on two attempts. Parenton would spend another season as a reserve quarterback for the Bulldogs before giving up football.

Parenton then pursued baseball full-time and was a 3-year letter winner for the Mississippi State Bulldogs baseball team.

Coaching career
Parenton began his coaching career immediately after college as a graduate assistant for his alma mater Mississippi State.

After stepping away from college baseball, Parenton returned as an assistant coach for the Old Dominion Monarchs baseball program where he worked under his former colleague, Pat McMahon. After 5 years as an assistant, Parenton was up for the head coaching job at Old Dominion, but eventually lost out to Tony Guzzo Parenton returned to Mississippi State as an assistant in 1995 through 1997.

In 1997, Parenton was hired to lead the Samford Bulldogs baseball program. The Bulldogs struggled under Parenton, never finishing over .500 and only qualifying for the conference tournament twice. Despite this, Parenton was named the 2004 Ohio Valley Conference Coach of the Year. On July 15, 2004, Parenton stepped down from his post at Samford to become an assistant coach at Florida.

On August 10, 2007, Parenton returned to Jesuit High School as the school's baseball coach. On April 22, 2010, it was announced that Parenton would complete the season with Jesuit, but then return to college baseball as an assistant with the North Florida Ospreys baseball team.

After three years as an assistant at North Florida, Parenton accepted his first professional challenge as the manager of the Hudson Valley Renegades of the Tampa Bay Rays organization. Parenton guided the Renegades to the 2017 New York–Penn League Championship in 2017.

On June 5, 2017, Parenton was named the 3rd head coach in North Florida history.

Head coaching record

See also
 List of current NCAA Division I baseball coaches

References

External links
North Florida Ospreys bio

Living people
Mississippi State Bulldogs football players
Mississippi State Bulldogs baseball players
Old Dominion Monarchs baseball coaches
Mississippi State Bulldogs baseball coaches
Samford Bulldogs baseball coaches
High school baseball coaches in the United States
North Florida Ospreys baseball coaches
Florida Gators baseball coaches
Minor league baseball coaches
Year of birth missing (living people)